Desmond Stanley Turner (born 17 July 1939) is a British Labour Party politician who was the Member of Parliament (MP) for Brighton Kemptown from 1997 to 2010.

Early life
He was educated at Luton Grammar School (now known as Luton Sixth Form College) on Bradgers Hill Road in Luton. At Imperial College London, he gained a BSc and MSc. At University College, London, he gained a PhD, researching Biochemistry. At Brighton Polytechnic, he got a PGCE, and subsequently became a teacher. He also became a partner in an independent brewery.

Turner was a Councillor on East Sussex County Council 1985–97, and on Brighton Borough Council 1994-96 and Brighton and Hove City Council 1996–97.

Parliamentary career
He contested Mid-Sussex in 1979. He stood down at the 2010 General Election, with the local Labour Party selecting Simon Burgess as their candidate to succeed him.

Personal life
His second wife is Lynn Rogers, whom he married in September 1997 in Brighton. He has a daughter from his first marriage to Lynette Gwyn-Jones, the former Leader of Brighton and Hove Council.

References

External links
 Guardian Unlimited Politics - Ask Aristotle: Desmond Turner MP
 His Home Energy Conservation Bill in 2001
 TheyWorkForYou.com - Desmond Turner MP
 BBC Politics page 

1939 births
Living people
Labour Party (UK) MPs for English constituencies
Members of East Sussex County Council
UK MPs 1997–2001
UK MPs 2001–2005
UK MPs 2005–2010
Alumni of the University of Brighton
Politicians from Brighton and Hove